Callicore mionina is a species of butterfly of the family Nymphalidae, sometimes treated as a subspecies of  Callicore lyca as Callicore lyca mionina.

Distribution
The wingspan is of about 47 mm. The uppersides of the forewings are black with a broad red median band. Also the uppersides of the hindwings are black, with an electric-blue area in the middle. The undersides of the forewing are similar to the upperside but show also a yellow band. The basic colour of the undersides of the hindwings is black, with six pale blue spots in the middle of a black oval surrounded by concentric yellow bands.

Distribution
This species occurs in Colombia.

References

 Biolib
 "Callicore Hübner, [1819]" at Markku Savela's Lepidoptera and Some Other Life Forms

External links
 Callicore mionina
 Butterflies of America

Biblidinae
Nymphalidae of South America